Fairmount Rowing Association is an amateur rowing club, founded in 1877.  The facility, located at #2 Boathouse Row in the historic Boathouse Row of Philadelphia, Pennsylvania, is on the National Register of Historic Places. Fairmount originally catered to blue-collar youths living in the Fairmount neighborhood. In 1916, after decades of being rejected, the club was finally allowed to join the Schuylkill Navy. The Club boasts being known as the "premiere club for Masters rowing in the mid-Atlantic region" and has produced several world class rowers.

History of the boathouse

The structure currently known as #2 Boathouse Row is a result of a 1945 expansion project that eliminated #3 Boathouse Row by merging it into Fairmount Rowing Association's building at #2 Boathouse Row.

Pacific Barge Club
Pacific Barge Club was founded in 1859, but was not a member of the Schuylkill Navy. In 1860, Pacific Barge Club built a stone cottage-style boathouse at the site of #2 Boathouse row. Half of the building was occupied by the Pacific Barge Club while the other half was rented to the Philadelphia Boat Club. In 1881, the Fairmount Rowing Association purchased #2 Boathouse Row and Pacific Barge Club's equipment.

In 1904, Fairmount Rowing demolished the stone building built by Pacific Barge Club. Walter Smedley, a founder of the T-Square Club, designed the Georgian Revival style Flemish bond brick structure that replaced the 1860 stone boathouse and now occupies the southern half of the Fairmount Rowing's boathouse. Smedley, specialized in colonial revival residences, and also designed the Northern National Bank and the West Philadelphia Title and Trust Company.

Camilla Boat Club and Quaker City Barge Club
Camilla Boat Club was a founding member of the Schuylkill Navy. Camilla was a champion of the Schuylkill, but the Club disband as a result of disagreements between members. In 1858, the remnants of the defunct Camilla Boat Club reorganized to form Quaker City Barge Club.

By 1866, Quaker City Barge Club had purchased #3 Boathouse Row from the Pacific Barge Club. Among various rowing accomplishment, Quaker City raced the first four oared boat with coxswain. The Quaker City Barge Club began to decline in the 1880s and never raced in the Schuylkill Navy Regatta after 1926. In 1932, the Quaker City Barge Club declared itself “inactive” in the Schuylkill Navy and became completely defunct in the 1940s.  In 1945, under the leadership of John Carlin, Fairmount Rowing Association bought Quaker City Barge Club's equipment and absorbed its boathouse, which now serves as the northern half of Fairmount Rowing's boathouse.

References

Further reading

External links

Fairmount Rowing Association on wikimapia.org

Rowing clubs in Philadelphia
Boathouse Row
Schuylkill Navy
Sports clubs established in 1877
1877 establishments in Pennsylvania
Philadelphia Register of Historic Places
Boathouses on the National Register of Historic Places in Pennsylvania
Historic district contributing properties in Pennsylvania